NGC 546 (also known as ESO 296-25, IRAS 01229-3819, MCG −6-4-29 and PGC 5255) is a barred spiral galaxy about 270 million light years away from Earth and located in the constellation Sculptor. The largest diameter is 1.40 (122 thousand light years) and the smallest is 0.5 angular minutes (43 thousand light years). The first discovery was made by John Frederick William Herschel on 23 October 1835.

References

Barred spiral galaxies
Sculptor (constellation)
Galaxies discovered in 1835
0546
005255